For the Flag is a 1913 American silent short drama film written and directed by Lorimer Johnston. The film features Charlotte Burton, George Periolat, J. Warren Kerrigan, Jack Richardson, and Vivian Rich.

External links

1913 films
1913 drama films
Silent American drama films
American silent short films
American black-and-white films
1913 short films
Films directed by Lorimer Johnston
1910s American films